Cimetropium bromide is a belladonna derivative. Evidence does not support its use in infantile colic.

References 

Muscarinic antagonists
Tropanes
Quaternary ammonium compounds
Epoxides
Bromides